Eugenie Bondurant (born April, 27 1961 in New Orleans, Louisiana) is an American actress, singer, photographer, and model.

Early life and education
Bondurant studied at the University of Alabama She was spotted on the streets of her hometown by a model scout, which launched her career in the entertainment industry.

Career
She modeled on runways in New York City and Paris. It was in Los Angeles that she landed her first television role as Luna on the 1992 series Lady Boss. This was followed by other appearances in various television series, which include Frasier (1993), Something Wilder (1995) and Arli$$ (1996). She has also acted in a number of films, such as Mel Taybach in Saints and Sinners (1994), as Natalia in Sorority House Vampires (1998), as Cherry in Patsy (2008) and as Tigris in The Hunger Games: Mockingjay - Part 2 (2015). Most recently she appeared in Werewolf by Night, as one of the hunters to compete for the Bloodstone.

Since 2004 she has also worked as an acting coach and is a member of the Patel Conservatory. From 2008 to 2009 she earned the Meisner Teaching Certification at the True Acting Institute. Beginning in 2005 she has been a cabaret singer alongside Paul Wilborn and Blue Roses in the American Songbook Series. She was also a founder of the Radio Theater Project, launched in 2009.

Personal life
She is married to Paul Wilborn.

Filmography 
 1992: Lady Boss (TV Movie)
 1993: Frasier (TV Series, one episode)
 1994: Saints and Sinners
 1995: Something Wilder (TV Series, one episode)
 1996: Arli$$ (TV Series, one episode)
 1996: Space Truckers
 1998: Sorority House Vampires
 1999: Fight Club
 2004: Donald and Dot Clock Found Dead in Their Home
 2004: The Brooke Ellison Story (TV Movie)
 2005: Elvis (TV Movie)
 2008: The Year of Getting to Know Us
 2008: Patsy
 2015: The Hunger Games: Mockingjay – Part 2
 2016: NCIS: New Orleans (TV Series, one episode)
 2017: Tiny Bacteria (Short Film)
 2017: The Knock (Short Film)
 2018: Good Morning St. Pete! (TV Movie)
 2019: Darlin’
 2020: Longer (Short Film)
 2021: Fear of Rain
 2021: The Conjuring: The Devil Made Me Do It
 2022: Werewolf by Night

References

External links 
 
 Eugenie Bondurant at memory-alpha.org (a Star Trek wiki)
 Entry at nowcasting.com

1961 births
Living people
Actresses from Louisiana
American stage actresses
American television actresses
20th-century American actresses
21st-century American actresses